La Soufrière or Soufrière Saint Vincent is an active stratovolcano on the Caribbean island of Saint Vincent in Saint Vincent and the Grenadines. It is the highest peak in Saint Vincent, and has had five recorded explosive eruptions since 1718. The latest eruptive activity began on 27 December 2020 with the slow extrusion of a dome of lava, and culminated in a series of explosive events between 9 and 22 April 2021.

Geography and structure 
At , La Soufrière is the highest peak on Saint Vincent as well as the highest point in Saint Vincent and the Grenadines. Soufrière is a stratovolcano with a crater lake and is the island's youngest and northernmost volcano. During periods of inactivity, visitors can view the volcanic crater by following a hiking trail that ascends through rainforest to the rim.

Eruptive history 
La Soufrière has had five explosive eruptions during the recorded historical period. It violently erupted in 1718, 1812, 1902, 1979, and 2021. A famous painting by J. M. W. Turner of the eruption on 30 April 1812 belongs to the Victoria Gallery & Museum, University of Liverpool.

Eruption of 1902 
The Saint Vincent eruption of 6 May 1902 killed 1,680 people, just hours before the eruption of Mount Pelée on Martinique that killed 29,000. On St. Vincent, a further 600 people were injured or burned and 4,000 were left homeless. The death zone, where almost all persons were killed, was mainly within Island Caribs habitat, an indigenous people of the Lesser Antilles in the Caribbean. This last large remnant of Carib culture was destroyed as a result of the volcano. By 1907, the volcano was considered inactive, and the crater lake had reformed.

Activity in 1971 
A minor event occurred in 1971, altering the structure of the volcano's crater lake.

Eruption of 1979 
An eruption on April 13, 1979 caused no casualties as advance warning allowed thousands of local residents to evacuate to nearby beaches. The 1979 eruption created a large ash plume that reached Barbados,  to the east of the volcano. A newspaper report stated that two infants had died during the evacuation of some 1,500 people, though the report was not confirmed. Financial and material aid was provided by the United Kingdom and USA.

2020–2021 activity

Increased seismic activity was detected in December 2020; and an effusive eruption began to form a new lava dome inside the summit crater on 27 December. Government officials began outreach efforts to residents in the area throughout December and January, in order to review evacuation plans in case volcanic activity at the volcano escalated. Sulfur dioxide emissions were being generated from the top of the dome. On 8 April 2021, after a sustained increase of volcanic and seismic activity over the preceding days, a red alert was declared and an evacuation order issued as an explosive phase of the eruption was deemed to be imminent.

By then, approximately 16,000 people had evacuated the area surrounding the volcano. Subsequent explosive eruptions, created by multiple pulses of ash, were reported in the afternoon and evening of 9 April, according to the University of the West Indies Seismic Research Centre. Explosions continued over the following days, with plumes reaching nearby Barbados and covering the island with ash. Residents were also faced with power outages and cut off water supplies, and the airspace over the island was closed due to the presence of smoke and thick plumes of volcanic ash. There were further reports of continued explosive activity and pyroclastic flows. The final explosion took place on 22 April 2021.

The eruption, rated as VEI-4 on the Explosivity Index, was comparable in size to the eruptions of 1979.

Support of inhabitants
Saint Lucia, Grenada, Antigua and Barbados all agreed to take in evacuees. Prime Minister Ralph Gonsalves encouraged people evacuating to shelters elsewhere on Saint Vincent to take the COVID-19 vaccine. Venezuelan Foreign Minister Jorge Arreaza announced via Twitter that his country would be sending humanitarian supplies and risk experts. Carnival Cruise Lines sent the Carnival Paradise and Carnival Legend to each transport up to 1,500 residents to neighbouring islands. The cruise line Royal Caribbean Group sent Serenade of the Seas and Celebrity Reflection.

Assistance and emergency financial support was being provided by several nearby islands, the United Kingdom and agencies such as the United Nations. The first significant offer of long-term funding, of US$20 million, was announced on 13 April 2021 by the World Bank.

See also

 List of volcanic eruptions by death toll

References

External links

 The University of the West Indies Seismic Research Centre
 National Emergency Management Organisation of St. Vincent and the Grenadines
 Smithsonian Institution's Global Volcanism Program | Soufrière St. Vincent
 UND Soufriere St. Vincent

20th-century volcanic events
Active volcanoes
VEI-4 volcanoes
Phreatic eruptions
Peléan eruptions
Mountains of Saint Vincent and the Grenadines
Mountains of the Caribbean
Holocene stratovolcanoes
Volcanic crater lakes
Volcanoes of Saint Vincent and the Grenadines
21st-century volcanic events
19th-century volcanic events
18th-century volcanic events